David Lawson Jacques  is a British garden historian. He specializes in landscape conservation and the history of 17th and 18th century gardens.

Jacques was appointed Officer of the Order of the British Empire (OBE) in the 2022 Birthday Honours for services to garden history and conservation.

Books
Gardens of Court and Country: English Design 1630-1730 (Paul Mellon Centre, 2017)
The Gardens of William and Mary (1978)
Georgian Gardens: The Reign of Nature (1983)
Landscape Modernism Renounced: The Career of Christopher Tunnard, 1910-1978 (Routledge, 2009)

References

Landscape historians
Living people
Year of birth missing (living people)
British garden writers
Officers of the Order of the British Empire